Glide guitar is a technique for playing guitar in which the player strums while holding the vibrato bar, resulting in a pitch that wavers. It was developed by Irish musician Kevin Shields of My Bloody Valentine on the band's releases You Made Me Realise (1988) and Isn't Anything (1988). Shields often combined this technique with a reverse reverb effect from a Yamaha SPX90 unit or Alesis Midiverb II, and would also tune two neighboring strings of his guitar to nearly the same pitch.

Shields explained that he "virtually invent[ed] my own way of playing. It didn't come about in any conscious way. ... It felt playful, but on a much stronger level." The technique was later referenced in the title of the group's EP Glider (1990).

See also
 Dream pop
 Shoegaze

References

External links

Guitar performance techniques
Shoegaze
My Bloody Valentine (band)